Mad About Mambo is a 2000 romantic comedy film written and directed by John Forte. It stars William Ash, Keri Russell and Brian Cox.

Plot 
A boy obsessed with football finds his life changing dramatically once he adds a little Samba. Danny (Ash) plays on the football team at the all-boys Catholic school he attends in Belfast. Danny's three best friends, who also play on the team, all have different ambitions for their lives. Mickey (Maclean Stewart) wants to be a fashion designer so he can get rich and date supermodels. Gary (Russell Smith) wants to become a magician so he can get rich and meet beautiful women (and presumably saw them in half). And Spike (Joe Rea) likes to beat people up, so he wants to become a mercenary and do it for a living. But Danny dreams of making football his life.

The players Danny most admires are South Americans, such as Pele and Carlos Riga, who he feels have a special rhythm and flexibility. Wanting to add some of these qualities to his own game, Danny has an idea: he'll take Samba lessons, in the hope that dancing like a South American will help him play like a South American. To the surprise of himself and his friends, Danny turns out to be a pretty good Latin dancer and finds himself smitten with a student in his dance class, Lucy (Russell). However, Lucy happens to have a boyfriend, who is a fierce competitor on one of Danny's rival teams. The film also stars Brian Flanagan who plays an inspiring cameo role along with members of Celbridge Town Football Club.

Cast 
 William Ash as Danny Mitchell
 Keri Russell as Lucy McLoughlin
 Brian Cox as Sidney McLoughlin
 Maclean Stewart as Mickey
 Joe Rea as Spike
 Russell Smith as Gary
 Theo Fraser Steele as Oliver Parr
 Tim Loane as Brother McBride
 Jim Norton as Brother Xavier
 Rosaleen Linehan as Mrs Burns
 Aingeal Grehan as Mrs Mitchell
 Gavin O'Connor as Seamus Mitchell
 Alan McKee as Frank Mallon
 Julian Littman as Rudi Morelli
 Daniel Caltagirone as Carlos Rega

Jackie Fullerton also makes a cameo as himself.

Production 
Despite being set in Belfast, the majority of filming took place in Dublin.  Filming began in May 1998.

Reception 
On Rotten Tomatoes the film has an approval rating of 57% based on reviews from 14 critics.  John Walker, in Halliwell's Film, Video & DVD Guide, wrote: 'Oddly titled corny romance - it has nothing to do with the mambo - that is frequently implausible but gets by on the charm of its two stars.'

References

External links 
 

2000 films
2000s dance films
2000 romantic comedy films
2000s sports comedy films
2000s teen comedy films
2000s teen romance films
British association football films
British dance films
British romantic comedy films
British sports comedy films
British teen comedy films
British teen romance films
Films set in Belfast
Films shot in the Republic of Ireland
Gramercy Pictures films
Irish romantic comedy films
Irish teen comedy films
Phoenix Pictures films
Teen sports films
USA Films films
2000s English-language films
2000s British films
2000 directorial debut films